The 2023 Columbus Crew season is the club's twenty-eighth season of existence and their twenty-eighth consecutive season in Major League Soccer, the top flight of soccer in the United States. The first match of the season was on February 25 against the Philadelphia Union. It is the first season under head coach Wilfried Nancy.

Roster

Non-competitive

Preseason

Competitive

MLS

Standings

Eastern Conference

Overall table

Results summary

Results by round

Match results

US Open Cup

Third round

Leagues Cup

Group stage

Central 1

Statistics

Appearances and goals
Under "Apps" for each section, the first number represents the number of starts, and the second number represents appearances as a substitute.

Disciplinary record

Clean sheets

Transfers

In

Loan in

Out

Loans out

See also
 Columbus Crew
 2023 in American soccer
 2023 Major League Soccer season

References

Columbus Crew seasons
Columbus Crew
Columbus Crew
Columbus Crew